Suppiah Dhanabalan  (born 8 August 1937), also known as S. Dhanabalan, is a Singaporean former politician who served as Minister for Foreign Affairs between 1980 and 1988. A member of the governing People's Action Party (PAP), he was the Member of Parliament (MP) representing Kallang SMC between 1976 and 1991, and the Kuo Chuan ward of Toa Payoh GRC between 1991 and 1996.

Dhanabalan was a prominent political leader in Singapore during the 1980s, where he served as Minister for Foreign Affairs between 1980 and 1988, Minister for National Development between 1987 and 1992, and Minister for Trade and Industry between 1992 and 1993 under Prime Ministers Lee Kuan Yew and Goh Chok Tong.

He had also served as Leader of the House between 1985 and 1987.

Early life
Dhanabalan was born in 1937 to Arumugam Suppiah, a clerk at a naval base and Gunaretnam Suppiah. He was the third child and the eldest son in a family of three girls and three boys.

Born in a Singaporean Indian family of Tamil descent, he was however raised as a Hindu. Later in his life, he became a devout Christian (Brethren).

Education
He attended Victoria School before graduating from the University of Malaya with a Bachelor of Arts with second class honours degree in economics.

Early career
Dhanabalan joined the Ministry of Finance as an administrative officer between 1960 and 1968. During his tenure, he helped to established the Economic Development Board and DBS Bank.

He subsequently left the Civil Service and joined DBS as a vice-president between 1968 and 1970. He was later promoted to the position executive vice-president and continue to serve between 1970 and 1978.

Political career
In the 1976 Singapore general election, Dhanabalan was elected as Member of Parliament for Kallang SMC, as a People's Action Party (PAP) candidate. 

During the 1980 Singaporean general election's rallies, Dhanabalan disparaged opposition politician Chiam See Tong on his professional competence. He was subsequently sued by Chiam for defamation and he issued a public apology over it.

Dhanabalan was subsequently promoted to a Cabinet Minister and served in various portfolios, including Foreign Affairs, Culture, Community Development, National Development and Trade and Industry.

When Lee Kuan Yew was preparing for his successor, he identified a handful of ministers he considered suitable for the job, including Tony Tan, Ong Teng Cheong, Goh Chok Tong and Dhanabalan.

In his public account of why he chose them and what he felt were their strengths and weaknesses, Lee said his preferred successor was Tony Tan, who went on to become the 7th President of the Republic of Singapore. He felt that while the other three were all of prime ministerial calibre, each had a particular weakness: Goh was too stiff, lacking eloquence in public speaking, and Ong was too closely aligned with the Chinese-speaking masses, lacking appeal to other communities. In the case of Dhanabalan, Lee felt the 76% ethnic Chinese electorate was not yet ready for a prime minister of Indian ethnicity. Lee left the ultimate decision to the second generation ministers themselves, who went on to choose Goh.

Dhanabalan retired from Parliament in 1996.

Timeline
1960 : Graduated from university and joined the civil service.
1961–1968 : Economist with Economic Development Board.
1968–1978 : Helped to establish the Development Bank of Singapore.
1976–1991 : Member of Parliament for Kallang.
1980–1988 : Minister for Foreign Affairs.
1981–1984 : Minister for Culture.
1981–2005 : Director of Government Investment Corporation.
1984–1986 : Minister for Community Development.
1986–1991 : Minister for National Development.
1991 : Retired from politics.
1991–1993 : Returned to government as Minister for Trade and Industry.
1993–1996 : Chairman of Singapore Labour Foundation.
1996–1998 : Chairman of Singapore Airlines.
1996–2013 : Chairman of Temasek Holdings.
1998 : Appointed a permanent member of the Presidential Council for Minority Rights.
1999–2005 : Chairman of DBS Group Holdings.
2004–present : Member of the Council of Presidential Advisors.
2007 : Received the Order of Temasek (Second Class).
2015 : Received the Order of Temasek (First Class)

Career after politics
 Senior Advisor, Nuri Holdings – 1994–1999
 Chairman, Singapore Airlines – 1996–1998
 Chairman, Temasek Holdings – 1996–2013
 Chairman, Temasek Trust - Current
 Chairman, DBS Bank – 1999–2005
 Chairman, Parameswara Holdings Ltd – Current
 Director, Government of Singapore Investment Corporation – Current

Other contributions
 Member, Presidential Council for Minority Rights – Current
 Member, Council of Presidential Advisers – 2004–Current
 Member and Council chairman Emeritus, Asia Business Council – Current
 Founder Member, Singapore International Foundation
 President, Singapore Indian Development Association (SINDA) – 1996–2002
 Chairman, YMCA Advisory Council, YMCA of Singapore - 2010-2018

Personal life
Dhanabalan is a devout Christian (Brethren) and attends a small church in Bukit Panjang – Bukit Panjang Gospel Chapel. He is married to Christine Tan Khoon Hiap, a Chinese Singaporean of Hokkien ancestry and they have one son, Ramesh Dhanabalan, and one daughter, Shandini Dhanabalan.

References

External links
Australian Financial Review article

Members of the Cabinet of Singapore
Singaporean Protestants
Converts to Protestantism from Hinduism
Members of the Parliament of Singapore
Singaporean Baptists
Singaporean people of Indian descent
Temasek Holdings
People's Action Party politicians
Singaporean people of Tamil descent
Victoria School, Singapore alumni
1937 births
Living people
Recipients of the Darjah Utama Temasek
Singaporean politicians of Indian descent
Ministers for Foreign Affairs of Singapore
Ministers for Trade and Industry of Singapore